is a Japanese manga series written by Tomohiro Yokomaku and illustrated by Taishi Mori. It has been serialized in Shueisha's seinen manga magazine Grand Jump since October 2015. A two-season television drama adaptation, consisting of eleven episodes each, was broadcast on Fuji TV from April 2019 to December 2021. A live-action film premiered in April 2022.

Media

Manga
Written by Tomohiro Yokomaku and illustrated by Taishi Mori, Radiation House started in Shueisha's seinen manga magazine Grand Jump on October 21, 2015. In February 2023, it was announced that the manga would enter on hiatus due to Mori's poor health.

Shueisha has collected its chapters into individual tankōbon volumes. The first volume was released on June 17, 2016. As of February 17, 2023, fourteen volumes have been released.

Volume list

Drama
An eleven-episode television drama adaptation was broadcast on Fuji TV from April 8 to June 17, 2019. A second season was broadcast from October 4 to December 13, 2021.

Live-action film
In December 2021, it was announced that a live-action film adaptation, featuring the same cast from the drama, premiered on April 29, 2022.

References

External links
 
 
 
 

2019 Japanese television series debuts
2021 Japanese television series endings
Fuji TV original programming
Japanese drama films
Live-action films based on manga
Manga adapted into films
Manga adapted into television series
Medical anime and manga
Seinen manga
Shueisha manga